St. Christopher Island is the mostly ice-covered island extending 680 m in southwest–northeast direction and 580 m in southeast–northwest direction lying in Papazov Passage, Biscoe Islands. Its surface area is 24 ha.

The feature is named after Saint Christopher (3rd century), the patron saint of travellers.

Location
British mapping in 1976.

Maps
 British Antarctic Territory. Scale 1:200000 topographic map. DOS 610 Series, Sheet W 66 66. Directorate of Overseas Surveys, UK, 1976
 Antarctic Digital Database (ADD). Scale 1:250000 topographic map of Antarctica. Scientific Committee on Antarctic Research (SCAR). Since 1993, regularly upgraded and updated

See also
 List of Antarctic and subantarctic islands

Notes

References
 St. Christopher Island. SCAR Composite Gazetteer of Antarctica
 Bulgarian Antarctic Gazetteer. Antarctic Place-names Commission. (details in Bulgarian, basic data in English)

External links
 St. Christopher Island. Adjusted Copernix satellite image

Islands of the Biscoe Islands
Bulgaria and the Antarctic